Agostino Galamini, O.P. (1553 – 6 September 1639) was an Italian cardinal and bishop.

Biography
Agostino Galamini was born in Brisighella in 1553.   His mother was a relative of Agostino Recuperati, the Master of the Order of Preachers. He joined the Dominican Order, changing his name from Simone to Agostino. He did his novitiate in Faenza, and then took his monastic vows in Meldola.

After he was ordained as a priest, he accepted a teaching assignment at Bologna, later moving to Naples.  In 1592, he became inquisitor of Brescia; he later held the same office in Piacenza, then Genoa, then Milan.

He moved to Rome in 1604, becoming a commissioner of the Roman Inquisition.  Under Pope Clement VIII, he served as Master of the Sacred Palace.

The Dominican Order elected him Master of the Order of Preachers in 1608.

On 17 August 1611 Pope Paul V named him cardinal. On 14 November 1612 he received the titular church of Santa Maria in Aracoeli.

He participated in the papal conclave of 1621 that elected Pope Gregory XV and in the papal conclave of 1623 that elected Pope Urban VIII.

He was elected Bishop of Recanati and Loreto on 11 February 1631. He was consecrated as a bishop on 12 March 1631. On 29 April 1620 he was translated to the Diocese of Osimo.

He died in Genoa on 6 September 1639.

Episcopal succession

References
This page is based on this page on Italian Wikipedia.

Italian Dominicans
Masters of the Order of Preachers
17th-century Italian cardinals
Bishops in le Marche
1553 births
1639 deaths
Dominican cardinals
17th-century Italian Roman Catholic bishops